Italy competed at the 2022 Mediterranean Games in Oran, Algeria from 25 June to 6 July 2022.

Medal table

Archery

Men

Women

Mixed

Artistic gymnastics

Italy competed in artistic gymnastics.

Women
Team

Individual

Apparatus

Athletics

Italy competed in athletics.

Badminton

Italy competed in badminton.

Men

Women

Basketball

Italy won the bronze medal in the women's tournament. Italy also competed in the men's tournament.

Boules

Italy competed in boules.

Boxing

Italy competed in boxing.

Cycling

Italy competed in cycling.

Fencing

Italy competed in fencing.

Men

Football

Summary

Group play

Semifinal

Gold medal match

Handball

Summary

Men's tournament
Group play

Seventh place game

Judo

Italy competed in judo.

Karate

Italy competed in karate.

Sailing

Italy competed in sailing.

Shooting

Italy competed in shooting.

Swimming

Italy competed in swimming.

Men

Women

Table Tennis

Men

Women

Taekwondo

Men

Women

Tennis

Italy competed in tennis.

Men

Women

Volleyball

Italy competed in volleyball.

Water polo

Summary

Group play

Semifinal

Third place game

Weightlifting

Italy competed in weightlifting.

Men

Women

Wrestling

Italy competed in wrestling.

References

External links

Nations at the 2022 Mediterranean Games
2022
Mediterranean Games